Benjamin Grant Mitchell, generally known as Ben Mitchell, is a singer-songwriter, writer, and actor from Melbourne, Australia.

Music

Mitchell has independently released three albums: The Stars Can See (2006), Chance To Love (2015) and Summer Lover (2016). Mitchell's fourth album, 'Slow Is The New Fast' was produced by multi ARIA Music Awards winner, Matt Walker (Australian musician) and was released on 10 October 2019.

Radio play 

In 2016 Mitchell had a Number 1 song on the Australian Music Radio Airplay Project Regional Charts with 'Keep Community Radio'.

Australian Community Radio stations have been most supportive of Mitchell's music, with every track from his Chance To Love and Summer Lover albums receiving radio play at, or soon after, release. In 2015 Mitchell was chosen as the featured Artist for 'Play Vic Week 2015' by the Community Broadcasters Association of Victoria.

Acoustic Trip, London 
 
While living in London in the late 1990s and early 2000s Mitchell hosted an 'unplugged' singer-songwriter night called Acoustic Trip. Mitchell started the club while working as a dishwasher and short-order cook in The Lock Tavern, Camden in 1998, at the beginning of London's 'New Acoustic Movement'. The Acoustic Trip also had residencies at The Fusilier and Firkin/Caernavon Castle and The Purple Turtle in Mornington Crescent. Acts to have appeared at Acoustic Trip included Kate Havnevik, James Blunt, Cookie, Smoke Fairies, Louis Eliot (Rialto) and Martha Tilston.

The Stars Can See 

Mitchell lived and worked in London from 1998 to 2004 where he wrote and recorded the songs for his debut album, The Stars Can See. The Stars Can See was released by MGM Distribution MGM Distribution and picked up by independent radio stations in Australia including 3JJJ, 3RRR and most notably PBS 106.7FM. It features Claire Worrall from Robbie Williams band on keyboards, Pete Cuthbert (Rialto) on drums, Ben Sargeant (from The Script) on bass guitar and was co-produced by Mitchell and Ken Brake at Regal Lane Studios, Primrose Hill.

Chance To Love 

Recorded in Healesville, Yarra Valley, Victoria, Australia, every song on Chance To Love (2015) received radio play across Australia, mostly from community and independent radio stations. Mitchell played all the instruments and produced the album which was released on 17 April 2015.

Mitchell's 2015 independent release, Chance To Love, featured 17 songs, each of which was played on radio stations Australia wide, and in Ireland and UK. Stephen Walker from 3RRR's 'Skullcave' called Chance To Love his "favourite local release at the moment."; The Music's Jeff Jenkins called it "a late night gem."

Summer Lover 

Summer Lover was released on 21 June 2016. It was recorded in Healesville and mixed by mixed by Simon Russell (whose credits include Hiatus Kaiyote, Human Face, The Melodics and Husky). It features Andy Taite on bass, Glenn Maynard (Pollyanna) on drums and Shane Reilly (Tex Perkins, Lost Ragas) on pedal steel and baritone guitar.

Live appearances 

Mitchell has performed in Australia, England, Germany, France and The Netherland with appearances at Marysville Jazz & Blues Weekend, Queenscliff Music Festival, Spydafest UK, End of The Line, Maroondah Festival (Croydon), Moonee Ponds Festival and Healesville Music Festival.
Venues Mitchell has appeared at include: The Brunswick Hotel, The Corner Hotel, Edinburgh Castle, The Workers Club, Stag & Hunter Hotel, The Retreat Brunswick, The Blues Train and The Newsagency in Sydney.
In London, where Mitchell lived for 6 years from 1998 to 2004, he performed solo and with his band (Pete Cuthbert on drums, and Ben Sargeant, from The Script, on Bass Guitar).

Licensing 
An independent artist, Mitchell's music is licensed through Open Sea Music.

Acting
Ben Mitchell also works as an actor and presenter having played roles in Film, Theatre and Television.

Neighbours 

Mitchell has played the most roles in Neighbours having, as of 2019, appeared as five different characters: as a Coffee Shop customer (1989) who ordered a steak, despite Kerry Bishop's attempts to get him to order vegetarian, the original Brad Willis (1989), Cameron Hudson (1992-1993) – a motorcycle riding lawyer who shared a house with Beth Brennan played by Natalie Imbruglia (and cousin of his first named role of Brad Willis (who was now played by Scott Michaelson)) and Matt Freedman (2008) father to Margot Robbie.

Film and television work 

He had guest roles in the independent film, Chocolate Strawberry Vanilla (2013), and short film M is for Mutant (2014), both directed by Stuart Simpson.

Generally credited as Ben Mitchell, his full name was first recorded for playing ‘'Troy Keogh'’ in a 1996 episode of Blue Heelers titled 'Sex & Death'. Mitchell also played the role of Bevan Quinn in Skirts, a short-lived police drama for the Channel 7 network by Simpson Le Mesurier Films.

Writing

Starting out as a songwriter, Mitchell moved into longer form writing including blogging and novel writing.

The Last Great Day 

Mitchell is the author of The Last Great Day, an autobiographical novel released in April 2011.

Zippin Pippin 

A long-time fan of Elvis Presley, Mitchell wrote Zippin Pippin, a comedy-romance-road-trip about Elvis Presley's unknown, illegitimate Australian son.

References

External links 
 

Australian singer-songwriters
Living people
Male actors from Melbourne
Year of birth missing (living people)